Maamar Mamouni (born 28 February 1976 in Tours) is a former footballer. He played for clubs including Le Havre AC, US Créteil-Lusitanos (both France), Panserraikos (Greece), Louviéroise, Gent and Lierse (all Belgium). Born in France He was a member of the Algerian 2004 African Nations Cup team, who finished second in their group in the first round of competition before being defeated by Morocco in the quarter-finals.

National team statistics

Honours 
 La Louviére
 Belgian Super Cup: Runner-up 2003

References

External links
 
 

1976 births
Living people
Algerian footballers
Algeria international footballers
2000 African Cup of Nations players
2004 African Cup of Nations players
Tours FC players
AC Ajaccio players
Le Havre AC players
US Créteil-Lusitanos players
R.A.A. Louviéroise players
K.A.A. Gent players
French sportspeople of Algerian descent
Ligue 1 players
Ligue 2 players
Belgian Pro League players
Panserraikos F.C. players
Algerian expatriate footballers
Expatriate footballers in Greece
Expatriate footballers in Belgium
Algerian expatriate sportspeople in Belgium
Sportspeople from Tours, France
Algerian expatriate sportspeople in Greece
Association football midfielders
French footballers
Footballers from Centre-Val de Loire